Ten Songs in the Key of Betrayal is the fourth and final album by alternative rock group Alien Crime Syndicate released in 2004 through The Control Group and EMI.

Track listing

Personnel
Alien Crime Syndicate
Joe Reineke – vocals, guitar 
Jeff Rouse – bass, vocals
Nabil Ayers – drums

Additional personnel
Mike Davis – additional guitars on "Rescue", "The American Way", "Forever is Rock N' Roll"

Production personnel
Joe Reineke – production, mixing
Gil Norton – production
Mike Easton – engineering
Steve Carter – mixing
Howie Weinberg – mastering

References

2004 albums
Alien Crime Syndicate albums